Radomir "Rade" Koković (born 6 January 1984) is a Serbian retired professional footballer and current football manager.

Playing career
Koković played football with Loyola College in Maryland in the United States between 2003 and 2007 alongside compatriot Miloš Kocić.

In 2007, he returned to Serbia and played a half season with his birth-city lower league club FK Sloga Kraljevo, before moving, in December 2007, to Belgrade's club FK Rad. He took over as team captain during the 2010–11 season.

On 23 March 2011, Koković moved to China and signed a contract with Chinese Super League side Changchun Yatai on a loan deal for three months. His father Đorđe is also a former footballer.

From 2012 to 2014, he played for FK Napredak Kruševac and in the 2012–13 Serbian First League season became champion and got promoted to the Serbian SuperLiga.

In the summer of 2014, Koković joined FK Zemun playing in the Serbian League Belgrade. After suffering, at one point, what seemed a minor injury, complications followed and he was forced to finish his playing career at only the age of 30 in the winter of 2014.

Managerial career
Koković started off his managerial career being appointed as manager of China League Two club Shanghai JuJu Sports F.C., where he stayed during 2016.

Between 2018 and 2019, he managed three clubs in Serbia. From July 2018 to April 2019, FK Sinđelić Belgrade, from April to May 2019 FK Zemun and in May 2019, Koković was appointed the manager of Serbian SuperLiga club FK Voždovac. He held this position until March 2020 when he was sacked after a run of 5 straight losses.

Managerial statistics

Honours

Player

Club
Napredak
 Serbian First League: 2012–13

References

External links
 Radomir Koković at LoyolaGreyHounds.com
 Radomir Koković Stats at Utakmica.rs

1984 births
Living people
Sportspeople from Kraljevo
Serbian footballers
Expatriate soccer players in the United States
Serbian expatriate footballers
FK Sloga Kraljevo players
FK Rad players
FK Napredak Kruševac players
FK Zemun players
FK Zemun managers
Serbian SuperLiga players
Association football midfielders
Expatriate footballers in China
Serbian expatriate sportspeople in China
Changchun Yatai F.C. players
Chinese Super League players
Expatriate football managers in China
Serbian football managers